Marc Edward Heuck (born July 17, 1969) is an American actor, writer, and producer. He is best known for his role as The Movie Geek on the Comedy Central game show Beat the Geeks.

Early life
Heuck was born and raised in Cincinnati, Ohio.

Career
Heuck has worked as a film projectionist at Nuart Theatre, New Beverly Cinema, and Cinefamily.

Heuck provided audio commentary tracks and interview segments for the DVD releases of the 1981 slasher Scream, 1995 slasher satire Night of the Dribbler, Savage Streets, Cheerleaders' Wild Weekend, The Candy Snatchers, The Pyx, The Visitor, and the dark comedy Men Cry Bullets. Heuck also recorded a bonus commentary for the 1981 punk rock satire Ladies and Gentlemen, The Fabulous Stains.

Heuck wrote the foreword for Marc Salzman's DVD Confidential, a non-fiction book designed to help DVD viewers locate easter eggs in movies. He has been a writer for New Beverly Cinema and Night Flight and wrote trivia bumpers for El Rey Netowork's "Grindhouse Friday" movie broadcasts.

He appeared as a contestant on Win Ben Stein's Money before being cast as The Movie Geek on Beat the Geeks.

In 2014, Heuck was an Associate Producer on The Director's Chair for El Rey Network during its first season.

Filmography
Film

Television

References

External links

Living people
1969 births
People from Cincinnati
American male television actors
Screenwriters from Ohio